The Campeonato Alagoano is the football league of the state of Alagoas, Brazil.

Format

2020 First Division

The Campeonato Alagoano is divided into three stages.

First stage: simple round-robin, in which all eight teams play each other once. The four best-placed teams go to the Semifinals.
Semifinals: home-and-away playoff with the top 4 teams of the first stage (1st place x 4th place, 2nd place x 3rd place), with the two winners going to the Finals.
Finals: home-and-away playoff between the two qualified teams. The winner is declared the Campeonato Alagoano champion.

The last-placed team in the first stage is relegated to the second division.

Clubs

2021 First Division

Agremiação Sportiva Arapiraquense (ASA)
Centro Esportivo Olhodagüense (CEO)
Associação Atlética Coruripe
Clube de Regatas Brasil (CRB)
Centro Sportivo Alagoano (CSA)
Clube Sociedade Esportiva (CSE)
Desportivo Aliança Pilarense
Jaciobá Atlético Clube
Murici Futebol Clube

List of champions

Notes

Titles by team

Teams in bold stills active.

By city

References

External links
 
RSSSF

 
Alagoano